The Karelian Birch egg, also known as the Birch Egg, is a Fabergé egg, one of two Easter eggs made under the supervision of Peter Carl Fabergé in 1917 for the last Tsar of Russia Nicholas II. It was the second to last Fabergé egg made, before Constellation. The Karelian Birch egg was considered lost until 2001 when the Moscow collector, Alexander Ivanov, purchased it for his Russian National Museum. Despite the official name, this is a private collection. In 2009, Ivanov opened the Fabergé Museum in Baden-Baden, and the Birch Egg is now in that museum.

Design 
The egg is made out of Karelian birch panels set in a gold frame. This is a departure in design from previous eggs, which were far more ornate and gilded.  The change was due to austerity measures taken as a result of World War I, both by the Russian Imperial family, and the House of Fabergé.  A number of the Fabergé Imperial Easter eggs created during the war (those ordered by the Tsar as Easter gifts for members of the Russian Imperial family, as opposed to other eggs produced by Fabergé), utilized unusual and less costly materials.  However, the Karelian Birch egg was the only one to use an organic substance (wood) as a primary construction element.  Its "surprise" was a miniature mechanical elephant, covered with tiny rose-cut diamonds, wound with a small jewel-encrusted key.

History 

The Birch Egg was created in 1917, and was due to be completed and delivered to the Tsar that Easter, as a present for his mother, the Empress Maria Feodorovna. Before the egg was delivered however, the February Revolution took place and Nicholas II was forced to abdicate on March 15. On April 25, Fabergé sent the Tsar an invoice for the egg, addressing Nicholas II not as "Tsar of all the Russians" but as "Mr. Romanov, Nikolai Aleksandrovich". Nicholas paid 12,500 rubles and the egg was sent to Grand Duke Michael Alexandrovich at his palace, for presentation to the Empress, but the Duke fled before it arrived. The egg remained in the palace until it was looted in the wake of the October Revolution later that year.

After the October Revolution the egg was acquired by the Rumyantsev Museum in Moscow. It disappeared once again after the museum closed in January 1927 and was presumed lost. In 1999 Fabergé's great-granddaughter Tatiana published drawings of the designs for the Birch and Constellation Eggs, but it was assumed that they were both incomplete. The Birch Egg publicly reappeared in 2001 when a private collector from the United Kingdom, the descendant of Russian emigrants, sold it to Alexander Ivanov, the Moscow collector who owns the Faberge Museum in Baden-Baden. The complete purchase, which cost the museum "millions of dollars", consisted of the egg itself, the case, the wind-up key for the surprise, Fabergé's original invoice to Nicholas II, and a letter from Fabergé to Alexander Kerensky complaining about not being paid and asking that the egg be delivered. The "surprise" itself was not in the collector's possession and was likely stolen by soldiers during the October Revolution.

References

Sources

1917 works
Imperial Fabergé eggs